The City Addicted to Crystal Meth is a British documentary by Louis Theroux. It was televised on 9 August 2009. Theroux filmed his documentary in Fresno, California which has one of the highest number of crystal meth users in the United States.

Reception
The documentary garnered mixed reviews. The Times said "Theroux risks becoming the Alan Whicker de nos jours, a tourist with a typewriter, peering into these other lives but rarely getting dirty himself."

The Guardian called the work "an extraordinary film, a sad portrait of a very different California".

References

Louis Theroux's BBC Two specials
BBC television documentaries
2009 television specials
Documentary films about drug addiction
Culture of Fresno, California
Methamphetamine in the United States
Documentary films about cities in the United States
Documentary films about California
Television episodes set in California
BBC travel television series